RFA Tidereach (A96) was a  of the Royal Fleet Auxiliary.

Laid down on 2 June 1953 by Swan Hunter & Wigham Richardson, and launched on 2 June 1954, Tidereach was commissioned on 30 August 1955 and served until March 1978.

She was then laid up in Portsmouth for disposal. On 22 February 1979 she was sold for scrap, and left Portsmouth under tow on 16 March 1979. On 20 March 1979 she arrived at Bilbao, Spain to be broken up.

Tide-class replenishment oilers
Ships built on the River Tyne
1954 ships